The 73rd Directors Guild of America Awards, honoring the outstanding directorial achievement in feature films, documentary, television and commercials of 2020, were presented virtually on April 10, 2021. The nominations for the television and documentary categories were announced on March 8, 2021, while the nominations for the feature film categories were announced on March 9, 2021.

Winners and nominees

Film

Television

Commercials

Frank Capra Achievement Award
 Brian E. Frankish

Franklin J. Schaffner Achievement Award
 Joyce Thomas

Robert B. Aldrich Service Award
 Betty Thomas

Honorary Life Member
 Paris Barclay

References

External links
 

Directors Guild of America Awards
2020 film awards
2020 television awards
2020 in American cinema
2020 in American television
2021 awards in the United States